This list of the Mesozoic life of Arizona contains the various prehistoric life-forms whose fossilized remains have been reported from within the US state of Arizona and are between 252.17 and 66 million years of age.

A

 †Acaenasuchus – type locality for genus
 †Acaenasuchus geoffreyi – type locality for species
 †Acallosuchus – type locality for genus
 †Acallosuchus rectori – type locality for species
  †Acanthohoplites
 †Acanthohoplites berkeyi
 †Acanthohoplites erraticus
 †Acanthohoplites hesper
 †Acanthohoplites impetrabilis
 †Acanthohoplites schucherti
 †Acanthohoplites teres
 Acila
 †Acila schencki
 Acirsa
 †Acirsa kelseyi – type locality for species
 Acmaea
 †Acrodus
 †Acteon
 †Acteon propinguis
 †Actinastrea
 †Adamanasuchus – type locality for genus
 †Adamanasuchus eisenhardtae – type locality for species
 †Admetopsis
 †Admetopsis subfusiformis
  †Adocus
  †Allocrioceras
 †Allocrioceras annulatum
 †Alzadites
 †Alzadites incomptus
 †Ambrosea
 †Ambrosea nitida
 †Ammorhynchus – type locality for genus
 †Ammorhynchus navajoi – type locality for species
 †Anaschisma – report made of unidentified related form or using admittedly obsolete nomenclature
 †Anatimya
 †Anatimya virgata
 †Anchura
 †Anchura hopii – type locality for species
  †Angistorhinus – tentative report
 †Anisoceras
 †Anisoceras coloradoense
 †Anisodontosaurus – type locality for genus
 †Anisodontosaurus greeri – type locality for species
 †Anisomyon
 †Anisomyon spp.
 †Anomia
 †Anomia ponticulana
 †Antediplodon
 †Antediplodon dockumensis
 †Apachesaurus
 †Apachesaurus gregorii
  †Apatosaurus
 †Aphrodina
 †Aphrodina munda – or unidentified comparable form
  †Araucarioxylon
 †Araucarioxylon arizonicum
 †Arca
 Arcopagia – or unidentified comparable form
 †Arcopagia A – informal
 Arctica
  †Arganodus
 †Aricycas
 †Aricycas paulae
  †Arizonasaurus – type locality for genus
 †Arizonasaurus babbitti – type locality for species
 Astarte
 †Astarte adkinsi
  †Australosomus – or unidentified comparable form

B

  †Baculites
 †Baculites calamus
  Barbatia
 †Barbatia tramitensis
 †Barrancapus
 †Batrachopus
 †Batrachopus deweyi
 †Bellifusus
 †Bellifusus gracilistriatus
 †Bellifusus willistoni – or unidentified comparable form
 †Beudanticeras
 †Beudanticeras victoris
  †Boreosomus – tentative report
 †Borissiakoceras
 †Borrissiakoceras
 †Borrissiakoceras orbiculatum
 Brachiodontes
 †Brachiodontes filisculptus
 †Brachychirotherium
 †Brasilichnium – or unidentified comparable form
 †Breviarca – tentative report
 †Burroceras
 †Burroceras clydense
 †Burroceras transitorium

C

 Cadulus
 †Cadulus praetenuis
 †Calamites
 †Calamophylliopsis
 †Calamophylliopsis sandbergeri
 †Calsoyasuchus – type locality for genus
 †Calsoyasuchus valliceps – type locality for species
  †Calycoceras
 †Calycoceras naviculare
 †Calyptosuchus
 †Calyptosuchus wellesi
  †Camposaurus – type locality for genus
 †Camposaurus arizonensis – type locality for species
 †Camptonectes
 †Camptonectes A – informal
 †Camptonectes B – informal
 †Camptonectes platessa
  †Caprina
 †Caprinuloidea
 †Caprinuloidea gracilis
 Carota
 †Carota dalli
 Caryocorbula
 †Caryocorbula nematophora
  †Ceratodus
 †Cerithioderma
 †Cerithioderma darcyi – type locality for species
 †Cerithioderma occidentalis
 Cerithiopsis
 †Cerithiopsis sohli – type locality for species
 Charonia – tentative report
 †Charonia kanabense
 †Charonia soozi – type locality for species
 †Chatterjeea
  †Chindesaurus – type locality for genus
 †Chindesaurus bryansmalli – type locality for species
  †Chinlea – tentative report
  †Chirotherium
 †Chirotherium barthii
 †Chirotherium rex – type locality for species
 †Chirotherium sickleri
 Chlamys
 †Chlamys thompsoni
 †Choffaticeras
 †Choffaticeras pavillieri – or unidentified comparable form
 †Chondrodonta
 †Cibolaites
 †Cibolaites molenaari
 †Cionichthyes
 †Cionichthys – or unidentified comparable form
 †Coalcomana
 †Coalcomana ramosa
 †Coelophysis
  †Coelophysis kayentakatae – type locality for species
  †Collignoniceras
 †Collignoniceras carolinum – or unidentified related form
 †Collignoniceras woollgari
 †Colognathus
 †Colognathus obscurus
 †Colombiceras – tentative report
 †Colombiceras brumale
 Corbula
 †Corbula kanabensis
 †Cosgriffius – type locality for genus
 †Cosgriffius campi – type locality for species
 †Craginia
 †Craginia turriformis
  †Craniscus
 †Craniscus hesperius – type locality for species
 Crassatella
  Crassostrea
 †Crassostrea soleniscus
  †Crosbysaurus
 †Crosbysaurus harrisae
 Cucullaea
 †Cucullaea depressa
 †Cucullaea stephensoni
 †Cunningtoniceras
 †Cunningtoniceras novimexicanum
 Cuspidaria
 †Cuspidaria alaeformis
 †Cyclorisma
 †Cyclorisma orbiculata
 †Cyclothyris
 †Cyclothyris americana – type locality for species
 Cylichna
 †Cylinodrotruncatum
 †Cylinodrotruncatum spp.
 †Cymbophora
 †Cymbophora emmonsi
 †Cymbophora huerfanensis
 †Cymbophora utahensis
 †Cyprimeria
 †Cyprimeria cyprimeriformis

D

 †Dakotacorbula
 †Dakotacorbula senecta
 †Dechellyia
 †Dechellyia gormani – type locality for species
  †Dentalium
 †Deshayesites – tentative report
 †Deshayesites butleri
  †Desmatochelys
 †Desmatochelys lowi
  †Desmatosuchus
 †Desmatosuchus haplocerus
 †Desmatosuchus spurensis
 †Dilophosauripus – type locality for genus
 †Dilophosauripus williamsi – type locality for species
  †Dilophosaurus
 †Dilophosaurus wetherilli – type locality for species
 †Dinnebitodon – type locality for genus
 †Dinnebitodon amarali – type locality for species
 †Dinnetherium – type locality for genus
 †Dinnetherium nezorum – type locality for species
 Discinisca
 †Dolicholatirus – tentative report
 †Drepanocheilus
 †Drepanocheilus ruidium
 †Drepanochilus
 †Drepanochilus ruidium
  †Dromomeron
 †Dromomeron gregorii
 †Dufrenoyia
 †Dufrenoyia compitalis
 †Dufrenoyia joserita
 †Dufrenoyia justinae

E

 †Edentosuchus – tentative report
 †Edentosuchus undescribed species – informal
 †Edentosuchus undescribed species 1 – informal
 †Edentosuchus undescribed species 2 – informal
 Elliptio
 †Entolium
 †Entolium gregarium
 †Eoacteon – tentative report
  †Eocaecilia – type locality for genus
 †Eocaecilia micropodia – type locality for species
  †Eocyclotosaurus
 †Eocyclotosaurus wellesi – type locality for species
 †Eopneumatosuchus – type locality for genus
 †Eopneumatosuchus colberti – type locality for species
  †Eucalycoceras
 †Eucalycoceras pentagonum
 †Eulima – tentative report
 †Eulima funicula
 †Eunaticina
 †Eunaticina textilis
 †Euomphaloceras
 †Euomphaloceras irregulare
 †Euomphaloceras septemseriatum
 †Euspira
 †Euspira concinna
 †Euspira stantoni – type locality for species
 †Exogyra
 †Exogyra acroumbonata
 †Exogyra lancha
 †Exogyra levis
 †Exogyra olisiponensis

F

  †Fagesia
 †Fagesia catinus
 †Felixigyra
 †Flemingostrea
 †Flemingostrea prudentia
 †Fulpia
 †Fulpia pinguis

G

 †Gemmarcula
 †Gemmarcula arizonensis – type locality for species
 †Gemmarcula menardi
  †Gervillia
 †Gervillia cholla
 †Gervillia heinemani
 †Gervillia navajovus – type locality for species
 †Gervillia rasori
  Ginkgo
 †Grallator
 †Grallator cursorius
 †Granocardium
 †Granocardium trite
 †Graphidula
 †Graphidula walcotti
 †Gregania – tentative report
  †Gryphaea
 †Gryphaeostrea
 †Gryphaeostrea elderi – type locality for species
 †Gryphaeostrea nationsi – type locality for species
 Gyrodes
 †Gyrodes conradi
 †Gyrodes depressa
 †Gyrodes tramitensis – or unidentified comparable form
 †Gyrolepis
 †Gyrotropis
 †Gyrotropis nationsi – type locality for species

H

  †Hadrokkosaurus – type locality for genus
 †Hadrokkosaurus bradyi – type locality for species
 †Hamites
 †Hamites simplex
 †Hamulus
 Hemiaster
 †Hemiaster jacksoni – or unidentified comparable form
  †Hesperosuchus – type locality for genus
 †Hesperosuchus agilis – type locality for species
 Homarus
 †Hopiichnus – type locality for genus
 †Hopiichnus shingi – type locality for species
 †Hybodus

I

 †Immunitoceras
 †Immunitoceras immunitum
  †Inoceramus
 †Inoceramus corpulentas
 †Inoceramus dimidius – or unidentified comparable form
 †Inoceramus flavus
 †Inoceramus heinzi – or unidentified related form
 †Inoceramus lamarcki
 †Inoceramus nodai
 †Inoceramus pictus
 †Inoceramus tenuistriatus() – tentative report
 †Isochirotherium
 †Isochirotherium coltoni – type locality for species
 †Isochirotherium marshalli

K

 †Kamerunoceras
 †Kamerunoceras turoniense
  †Kayentachelys – type locality for genus
 †Kayentachelys aprix – type locality for species
 †Kayentapus – type locality for genus
 †Kayentapus hopii – type locality for species
 †Kayentasuchus – type locality for genus
 †Kayentasuchus walkeri – type locality for species
  †Kayentatherium – type locality for genus
 †Kayentatherium wellesi – type locality for species
  †Kayentavenator – type locality for genus
 †Kayentavenator elysiae – type locality for species
 †Kazanskyella
 †Kazanskyella arizonica
 †Koskinonodon
 †Koskinonodon perfectus
 †Koupichnium – probable lapsus calami of Kouphichnium
 †Kraterokheirodon – type locality for genus
 †Kraterokheirodon colberti – type locality for species
 †Kummelonautilus

L

 †Lasalichthys – or unidentified comparable form
 Laternula
 †Laternula lineata
 †Legumen
 †Legumen ligula – or unidentified comparable form
  Lepisosteus
  †Leptosuchus
 †Leptosuchus crosbiensis
 †Levicerithium
 †Levicerithium basicostae
 †Levicerithium micronema – tentative report
 †Levicerithium timberanum – or unidentified comparable form
 Lima
 †Lima cholla
 †Lima espinal
 †Lima muralensis
 †Lima utahensis
 Limatula
 †Limatula kochi
 †Linearis
 †Linearis striatimarginata
 †Linearis whitei
 †Lingula
 †Lingula subspatula
 †Liopistha
 †Liopistha meeki
  †Lissodus – tentative report
 †Lithocodium
 Lithophaga
 †Lonchidion
 †Lonchidion humblei
 †Longitubus
  Lopha
 †Lopha bellaplicata
 †Lopha staufferi
 †Lucina
 †Lucina subundata
  Lunatia – tentative report
 †Lutema
 †Lutema hitzi

M

   †Machaeroprosopus – type locality for genus
 †Machaeroprosopus buceros
 †Machaeroprosopus jablonskiae – type locality for species
 †Machaeroprosopus mccauleyi – type locality for species
 †Machaeroprosopus pristinus – type locality for species
 †Machaeroprosopus tenuis – type locality for species
 †Machaeroprosopus validus – type locality for species
 †Mammillopora
 †Mammillopora encrusta – type locality for species
  †Mammites
 †Mammites nodosoides
 †Masculostrobus
 †Masculostrobus clathratus – type locality for species
 †Mathilia – tentative report
 †Mathilia ripleyana
 †Meekia
 †Megalosauripus
 †Melvius
  Membranipora – or unidentified comparable form
 †Mesolanites
 †Mesostoma
 †Metaptychoceras
 †Metaptychoceras reesidei
 †Metoicoceras
 †Metoicoceras geslinianum
 †Metoicoceras mosbyense
   †Metoposaurus
 †Metoposaurus fraasi – type locality for species
 †Microsolena
 †Microsolena texana
 †Modiolus
 †Modiolus attenuatus – or unidentified comparable form
 †Modiolus coloradoensis
 †Modiolus perryi – type locality for species
 †Moenkopia – type locality for genus
 †Moenkopia wellesi – type locality for species
 †Monopleura
 †Monopleura marcida – or unidentified comparable form
 †Moremanoceras
 †Moremanoceras scotti
  †Morganucodon
 †Morrowites
 †Mytiloides
 †Mytiloides columbianus
 †Mytiloides duplicostasus – or unidentified related form
 †Mytiloides hercynicus
 †Mytiloides kossmati
 †Mytiloides labiatus
 †Mytiloides latus – or unidentified comparable form
 †Mytiloides mytiloides
 †Mytiloides opalensis
 †Mytiloides submytiloides
 †Mytilus – tentative report

N

 †Nannometoicoceras
 †Nannometoicoceras acceleratum
 †Navahopus – type locality for genus
 †Navahopus falcipollex – type locality for species
 †Neithea
 †Neithea vicinalis
 †Nemodon
 †Neocardioceras
 †Neocardioceras juddii
 †Neocardioceras minutum
 †Neoptychites
 †Neoptychites cephalotus
  †Nerinea
 Nerita
 †Nerita spp.
  Neritina
 †Neritina spp.
 †Nigericeras
 †Nigericeras ogojaense – or unidentified comparable form
 Nucula
 †Nucula coloradoensis
 Nuculana
 †Nuculana mutuata

O

 †Obnixia – type locality for genus
 †Obnixia thaynesiana
  †Oligokyphus
 †Opis
 †Opis elevata
 †Orbitolina
 †Orbitolina texana
  Ostrea
 †Ostrea anomioides
 †Ostrea edwilsoni
 †Oxytoma
 †Oxytoma arizonensis – type locality for species

P

  †Pachyrhizodus – or unidentified comparable form
 †Paleopsephea
 †Paleopsephea arizonensis – type locality for species
 †Paracanthohoplites
 †Paracanthohoplites meridionalis
 †Parasimilia
 †Parasimilia spp.
  †Parasuchus
  †Paratypothorax
 †Parmicorbula
 †Parrishea
 †Parrishia – type locality for genus
 †Parrishia mccreai – type locality for species
 Parvilucina
 †Parvilucina juvenis
 †Pecten
 †Pecten peregrina
 †Perissoptera
 †Perissoptera prolabiata
 †Permocalculus
 Petrophyllia
 †Petrophyllia dartoni
 †Pharodina
 †Pharodina ferrana
 †Phelopteria
 †Phelopteria A – informal
 †Phelopteria B – informal
 †Phelopteria C – informal
 †Phelopteria dalli
 †Phelopteria E – informal
 †Phelopteria F – informal
 †Phelopteria gastrodes
 †Phelopteria minuta
 †Phoebodus
 Pholadomya
 †Pholadomya coloradoensis
 Physa
 †Physa reesidei – or unidentified comparable form
 †Pinna
 †Pinna kauffmani – type locality for species
 †Pinna petrina
 †Pirsilia
  †Placenticeras
 †Placenticeras cumminsi
   †Placerias – type locality for genus
 †Placerias hesternus – type locality for species
 †Plastomenus
 †Pleisiopinna – tentative report
 †Pleisopinna – tentative report
 †Pleuriocardia
 †Pleuriocardia pauperculum
 Plicatula
 †Plicatula ferryi
 †Plicatula hydrotheca
 †Pollex – tentative report
 Polydora – tentative report
 †Polystrata
 †Polystrata alba
 †Polytremacis
   †Poposaurus
 †Poposaurus gracilis
 Poromya
 †Poromya lohaliensis – type locality for species
   †Postosuchus
 †Postosuchus kirkpatricki
 †Pravusuchus
 †Pravusuchus hortus
 †Prionocyclus
 †Prionocyclus hyatti
 †Prionocyclus percarinatus
 †Procolophonichnium
  †Prosalirus – type locality for genus
 †Prosalirus bitis – type locality for species
 †Protelliptio – tentative report
  †Protome – type locality for genus
 †Protome batalaria – type locality for species
   †Protosuchus – type locality for genus
 †Protosuchus richardsoni – type locality for species
 †Pseudaspidoceras
 †Pseudaspidoceras flexuosum
 †Pseudaspidoceras pseudonodosoides
 †Pseudocalycoceras
 †Pseudocalycoceras angolaense
 †Pseudoperna
 †Pseudoperna bentonense
 †Pseudoperna bentonensis
 †Pseudopetalodontia
 †Pseudopetalodontia felixi
 †Pseudoptera
 †Pseudoptera propleura
 †Psilomya
 †Psilomya concentrica
 †Psilomya elongata
 †Psilomya meeki
 †Psilothyris
 †Psilothyris occidentalis
 †Pteraichnus – type locality for genus
 †Pteraichnus saltwashensis – type locality for species
 †Puebloites
 †Puebloites greenhornensis
 †Puebloites spiralis
 Pycnodonte
 †Pycnodonte kansasense – tentative report
 †Pycnodonte kellumi – or unidentified related form
 †Pycnodonte newberryi
 †Pyktes
 †Pyktes fusiformis
 †Pyncnodonte
 †Pyncnodonte kellumi – or unidentified related form
 †Pyncnodonte newberryi
 †Pyrgulifera
 †Pyrgulifera ornata
 †Pyropsis
 †Pyropsis coloradoensis – or unidentified comparable form
 †Pyropsis kochi – type locality for species

Q

 †Quasicyclotosaurus – type locality for genus
 †Quasicyclotosaurus campi – type locality for species
 †Quitmaniceras
 †Quitmaniceras reaseri – or unidentified comparable form

R

 †Radiolites
 Ramphonotus – or unidentified comparable form
 †Rectithyris
 †Rectithyris vespertina – type locality for species
 †Reticulodus – type locality for genus
 †Reticulodus synergus – type locality for species
   †Revueltosaurus
 †Revueltosaurus callenderi
 †Revueltosaurus hunti
 †Rhadalognathus – type locality for genus
 †Rhadalognathus boweni – type locality for species
 †Rhamphinion – type locality for genus
 †Rhamphinion jenkinsi – type locality for species
 †Rhombopsis – tentative report
 †Rhombopsis huerfanensis
 †Rhynchosauroides
 †Rhynchosauroides schochardti
 †Rhynchostreon
 †Rhynchostreon levis
  Ringicula
 †Ringicula codellana
 †Rioarribasuchus
 †Rioarribasuchus chamaensis
 Rostellaria
 †Rostellaria venenatus – tentative report
 †Rotodactylus – type locality for genus
 †Rotodactylus bradyi – type locality for species
 †Rotodactylus cursorius – type locality for species
 †Rubroceras
 †Rubroceras rotundum
  †Rutiodon

S

  †Sarahsaurus – type locality for genus
 †Sarahsaurus aurifontanalis – type locality for species
 Scalpellum – tentative report
 †Scaphites
 †Scaphites larvaeformis
 †Sciponoceras
 †Sciponoceras gracile
 †Scutarx – type locality for genus
 †Scutarx deltatylus – type locality for species
  †Scutellosaurus – type locality for genus
 †Scutellosaurus lawleri – type locality for species
  †Segisaurus – type locality for genus
 †Segisaurus halli – type locality for species
  †Selaginella
 †Selaginella anasazia – type locality for species
  †Semionotus – or unidentified comparable form
 †Senis
 †Senis elongatus
 †Sergipia
 †Sergipia hartti – tentative report
 Serpula
 †Serpula implicata
 †Serpula intrica
 †Serpula large
 †Shuvosaurus
 †Shuvosaurus inexpectatus
 †Sinzowiella
 †Sinzowiella spathi
  †Smilosuchus – type locality for genus
 †Smilosuchus adamanensis – type locality for species
 †Smilosuchus gregorii – type locality for species
 †Smilosuchus lithodendrorum – type locality for species
 Solemya
 †Solemya obscura
  †Sonorasaurus – type locality for genus
 †Sonorasaurus thompsoni – type locality for species
 †Spathites
 †Spathites puercoensis
 Spirorbis
 Squilla – tentative report
  †Stagonolepis
 †Stanocephalosaurus – type locality for genus
 †Stanocephalosaurus birdi – type locality for species
 †Stanocephalosaurus new species – informal
 †Stoliczkaia
 †Stoliczkaia scotti
 †Stomohamites
 †Stylocyathus
 †Sumitomoceras
 †Sumitomoceras conlini
 †Synaptichnium
 †Synaptichnium cameronensis – type locality for species
 †Synaptichnium diabloensis – type locality for species
 †Syncyclonema
 †Syncyclonema spp.
 †Syntarsus

T

 †Tanytrachelos
 †Tecovasaurus
 †Tecovasaurus murryi
 †Tecovasuchus
 †Tecovasuchus chatterjeei
 †Tectaplica – tentative report
 †Tectaplica utahensis
 Tellina
 †Tellina carlilana – type locality for species
 †Tenea
   †Tenontosaurus
 †Terebrimya
 Teredolithus
 †Therapsipus – type locality for genus
 †Therapsipus cumminsi – type locality for species
 †Thomasites
 †Thomasites gongilensis – or unidentified comparable form
 †Toucasia
 †Toucasia hancockensis
 †Tragodesmoceras
 †Tragodesmoceras bassi
 †Tragodesmoceras socorroense
 †Triasamnicola – or unidentified comparable form
 †Triasamnicola pilsbryi
 †Trigonia
 †Trigonia aliformis - or unidentified loosely related form
 †Trigonia cragini
 †Trigonia guildi
 †Trigonia kitchini
 †Trigonia mearnsi
 †Trigonia reesidei
 †Trigonia resoluta
 †Trigonia saavedra
 †Trigonia stolleyi
 †Trigonia weaveri
   †Trilophosaurus
 †Trilophosaurus buettneri
 †Trilophosaurus jacobsi – type locality for species
  †Triodus
 †Triodus moorei
 Trochocyathus
  Turritella
 †Turritella A – informal
 †Turritella B – informal
 †Turritella cobbani – type locality for species
 †Turritella codellana – type locality for species
 †Turritella kauffmani – type locality for species
 †Turritella whitei
 †Turseodus
 †Turseodus dolorensis – or unidentified comparable form
  †Typothorax
 †Typothorax coccinarum

U

 †Uatchitodon
 †Uatchitodon schneideri
 †Unicardium
 Unio

V

  †Vancleavea – type locality for genus
 †Vancleavea campi – type locality for species
  †Vascoceras
 †Vascoceras diartianum
 †Veniella
 †Veniella goniophora
 †Veniella mortoni
 †Vigilius
 †Vigilius wellesi
 Viviparus
 †Voysa
 †Voysa varia
 Vulsella

W

 †Watinoceras
 †Watinoceras coloradoense
 †Watinoceras devonense
 †Watinoceras hattini
 †Watinoceras praecursor – or unidentified comparable form
 †Watinoceras spp.
 †Weeksia
 †Wellesaurus
 †Wellesaurus peabodyi – type locality for species
 †Worthoceras
 †Worthoceras gibbosum
 †Worthoceras vermiculum

Y

 †Yezoites
 †Yezoites delicatulus

References
 

Arizona
Mesozoic
Arizona-related lists